Any Given Wednesday with Bill Simmons was an American talk show hosted by Bill Simmons. The series premiered on June 22, 2016, on HBO. On November 4, 2016, HBO announced it had canceled the series.

Episodes

Reception

Ratings
According to Nielsen live-plus-same-day data, through its first fifteen weeks, Any Given Wednesday averaged 203,667 live viewers per episode. HBO announced that the show averaged a total of 2.4 million weekly views across all platforms during that same time period.

Critical
Any Given Wednesday was met with negative to mixed reviews. Review aggregation website Metacritic gives the show a 51 out of 100, indicating "mixed or average reviews". As of September 2016, it held a 50% rating on Rotten Tomatoes. Bill Simmons was quoted as saying "We loved making that show, but unfortunately it never resonated with audiences like we hoped. And that's on me."

Cancellation
On November 4, 2016, the series was canceled by HBO. The final episode aired on November 9, 2016. Bill Simmons also issued a statement regarding the cancellation acknowledging the failure of the series.

References

2010s American television talk shows
2016 American television series debuts
2016 American television series endings
American sports television series
HBO original programming